James Follett (27 July 1939 – 10 January 2021) was an English author and screenwriter. Follett became a full-time fiction writer in 1976, after resigning from contract work as a technical writer for the Ministry of Defence. He wrote over 20 novels, several television plays and many radio dramas.

He died in January 2021 at the age of 81.

Works

Novels 
 The Doomsday Ultimatum (1976)
 Crown Court (1977)
 Ice (1978)
 U-700 (1979), based on his radio play The U-boat that lost its Nerve, in turn based on a true story during World War II.
 Churchill's Gold (1980)
 The Tiptoe Boys (1981) (filmed as Who Dares Wins)
 Earthsearch (1981, a novelization of Follett's radio drama Earthsearch)
 Deathship (1982, a novelization of Follett's radio drama Earthsearch II)
 Dominator (1984)
 Swift (1985). Set in 1996, it foresaw the proliferation of Mobile phones
 A Cage of Eagles (1989)
 Mirage (1988). A fictionalised account of the transfer of practically all documents and drawings of the Mirage III to the state of Israel during a temporary French arms embargo in the 1960s, through Sulzer Aircraft in Switzerland. These events led to the creation of the later IAI Kfir jet fighter in the 1970s.
 Torus (1990)
 Trojan (1991). Set mainly in 1999, Trojan, predicted high-definition television, hard-drive video recording and keyboard-free touchpad computers.
 Savant (1993)
 Mindwarp (1993, a prequel to Folllet's radio drama Earthsearch)
 Those in Peril (1995)
 Sabre (1997)
 Second Atlantis (1998, a revised version of Ice)
 Temple of the Winds (2000)
 Wicca (2000)
 The Silent Vulcan (2002 hardback) 
 A Forest of Eagles (2004 hardback, a sequel to A Cage of Eagles)
 Return of the Eagles (2004 hardback, concluding the Eagles trilogy)
 Hellborn (2009) (eBook)

Radio 
(AT indicates the play was heard on BBC Radio 4's Afternoon Theatre, a 60-minute slot; JBM that it was in Radio 4's Just Before Midnight 15-minute slot, and SNT: Radio 4's Saturday Night Theatre of 90 minutes.)
Rules of Asylum (1973*, 90 minutes), Wiped by the BBC, but kept in the form of a domestic FM recording by Follett himself and subsequently rebroadcast on BBC 7 and since 2011 on BBC Radio 4 Extra in three half-hour instalments.
The Light of A Thousand Suns (1974*, SNT), a cold war techno-thriller set in 1995
The Doppelganger Machine (1974, AT)
Speculator Sport (1974, AT)
The U-Boat That Lost Its Nerve (1975, SNT), a WWII historical drama regarding an informal trial of a German U-boat officer in a POW camp.
The War in Secret (1975, 3 episodes of 45 mins)
The Last Riot (1975, AT)
Jumbo (1976, SNT)
No Time on Our Side (1976, 60 mins)
The Rabid Summer (1976, SNT)
The Twisted Image (1977*, AT)
The Spanish Package (1977, SNT)
The War Behind the Wire (1977, 4 episodes of 45 mins)
A Touch of Slander (1977, AT)
The Destruction Factor (1978*, SNT; a serial in 6 30-minute parts, ecological science fiction)
Vendetta for a Judge (1979, SNT)
The Bionic Blob (1979*, JBM)
The Devil to Play (1979*, JBM)
The Bionic Blob and The Case of the Stolen Wavelengths (1979, JBM)
Softly Steal the Hours to Dawn (1979, JBM)
The Man Who Invented Yesterday (1980, JBM)
The Long Lonely Voyage of U-395 (1980, SNT)
Oboe at the Embassy (1980, AT)
Earthsearch (1981*, 10 episodes of 30 mins)
Earthsearch II (1982*, 10 episodes of 30 mins)
A Darkening of the Moon (1986, SNT)
Ice (1986*, SNT), based on Follett's novel.
 Men, Martians and Machines (2003). A three-hour career retrospective for BBC 7 named after the science fiction collection by Eric Frank Russell which had fired Follett's imagination.
Temple of the Winds (2009, 8 episodes of 20 mins)
Wicca (2004, 8 episodes of 20 mins)
Earthsearch Mindwarp (2006, 3 episodes of 45 mins)

An asterisk * after the year means the play has been repeated on BBC7 and/or BBC Radio 4 Extra.

Television 
 Blake's 7 – "Dawn of the Gods" and "Stardrive"
 Knowhow (eighteen "Hyperspace Hotel" segments of BBC series)
 Crown Court (six episodes of Granada TV series)
 The Squad (two episodes for Thames TV series)

Other works 
 Starglider – a science fiction novella accompanying the 1986 computer game of the same name.
 Starglider 2 – a science fiction novella accompanying the 1988 computer game of the same name, a sequel to Starglider.
 Tracker – a science fiction novella accompanying the 1988 computer game of the same name.
 Lost Eden – a science fiction novella accompanying the 1995 computer game of the same name.

References

External links
Official website
Articles and reviews: James Follett's radio work

1939 births
2021 deaths
20th-century English male writers
20th-century English novelists
21st-century English male writers
21st-century English novelists
English male novelists
English male screenwriters
English science fiction writers
English screenwriters